The Zermatt Marathon is an annual marathon distance (42.195 km) alpine mountain running event held in Zermatt, Switzerland.

Winners

See also
 Marathon du Mont Blanc

References

External links
 

Marathons in Switzerland
Mountain marathons
Golden Trail Series